Childfree Russia is a Russian opposition non-government movement founded by activist Edward Lisovskii (Эдвард Лисовский) who was forced to flee Russia in February 2022 by the Russian law enforcement forces. It was established in 2012 as the first childfree movement in Russia.

History 
Edward Lisovskii, a founder of the movement, is a marketer by profession. He headed the company "Advertising Group of the Russian Federation", which worked with advertising in the Moscow Metro, as well as online with the following celebrities - Victoria Bonya, Vadim Galygin, Justin Bieber, as well as Odnoklassniki, MTS and TV show.

In 2012, Edward Lisovskii compiled the principles of the Childfree ideology in Russia and opened several communities on social networks.

In 2013, VKontakte, at the request of the prosecutor's office, blocked communities on social networks and Edward's personal accounts.

In the same year, Edward's new community on the social network VKontakte was blocked without explanation, and the founder of the movement urgently left St. Petersburg.

According to the results of a study by the NAFI Analytical Center, in 2020, 46% of Russians aged 18 to 45 do not want to have children. State TV channels associate this fact with the development of his ideology.

In 2021, Russian MP Vitaliy Milonov, who is famous as far-right views politician, publicly stated, that he would like to ban Childfree Russian and put in prison its founder Lisovskii for spreading "childfree propaganda".

In 2022, Senator Margarita Pavlova came up with a bill to ban content related to сhildfree topics, and equate Edward Lisovskii with an extremist because of his childfree views.

At the same time, Edward moved to Indonesia and received two personal car license plates EDWARD and CHILDFREE.

Lisovskii constantly emphasizes that there is no childfree propaganda in Russia.

References 

Non-profit organizations based in Russia